Steven Mark Christoff (born January 23, 1958) is an American former professional ice hockey forward who played 248 regular season games in the NHL with the Minnesota North Stars, Calgary Flames, and Los Angeles Kings in 1980–84.

Christoff is best known for being a member of the "Miracle on Ice" 1980 U.S. Olympic hockey team that won the gold medal.

Biography

Amateur career
Steve Christoff grew up in Richfield, Minnesota and graduated from Richfield High School. As a member of the Richfield High School hockey team, he earned team MVP his junior and senior year, and was selected to the Minnesota High School All-State First Team and the U.S. High School All-American Team during his senior year in 1975-76.  He led his school to a state runner-up his senior season and was one of the most highly recruited U.S. hockey players in 1976. Before turning professional, Christoff attended the University of Minnesota where he played for the Minnesota Gophers for three seasons, from 1976–79. He led the team in scoring during his second year with 66 points (32 goals and 34 assists) and was named to the WCHA All-Star Second Team. During his third year, he led the team in scoring again with 77 points (38 goals and 39 assists). In what turned out to be his last collegiate game on March 23, 1979, Christoff scored a goal and earned an assist to help Minnesota win its third NCAA title in school history with a 4-3 victory over North Dakota. He made his international debut for Team USA at the 1979 Ice Hockey World Championship tournament in Moscow.

Professional career
Christoff was selected 24th overall in the 1978 NHL Entry Draft by the Minnesota North Stars. He joined the North Stars for 20 games after the Olympics, scoring eight goals and 15 points. The next year, he suited up for 56 games, netting 26 goals and 39 points and was one of the Stars' best performers as Minnesota lost the 1981 Stanley Cup finals to the New York Islanders. He also participated in the 1981 Canada Cup tournament as a member of Team USA. In 1981–82, Christoff appeared in 69 games, scoring 26 goals and 55 points, a career high. Although he was an extremely popular figure in Minnesota, Christoff was traded to the Calgary Flames for the 1982–83 season, but he was used in just 45 games, scoring nine goals and 17 points. In 1983–84, Christoff played his final season in the NHL, with the Los Angeles Kings, starting 58 games.

Post hockey career
Christoff recently retired as an airline pilot for Minneapolis-based Endeavor Air since retiring from hockey. He was named one of the 50 greatest players in University of Minnesota hockey history as part of "Legends on Ice" tribute in 2001.

In popular culture
In the 1981 TV movie about the gold medal-winning hockey team entitled Miracle on Ice, Christoff's character is played by Rick Rockwell, but is not listed in the film's credits. The model for the Hobey Baker Award trophy was Steve Christoff, who played for Richfield Minnesota High School, the University of Minnesota, the 1980 U.S. Olympic hockey team and in the NHL. Scott Johnson portrayed Christoff in the 2004 Disney film Miracle.

Awards and achievements

Career statistics

Regular season and playoffs

International

References

External links
 
 Christoff's bio at hockeydraftcentral.com

1958 births
1980 US Olympic ice hockey team
American men's ice hockey centers
Calgary Flames players
Commercial aviators
Ice hockey players from Minnesota
Ice hockey players at the 1980 Winter Olympics
Living people
Los Angeles Kings players
Medalists at the 1980 Winter Olympics
Minnesota Golden Gophers men's ice hockey players
Minnesota North Stars draft picks
Minnesota North Stars players
Oklahoma City Stars players
Olympic gold medalists for the United States in ice hockey
People from Richfield, Minnesota
Sportspeople from Springfield, Illinois
NCAA men's ice hockey national champions